The Asian Men's Softball Championship is the main championship tournament between national men's softball teams in Asia, governed by the Softball Confederation of Asia.

Results

Medal table
As of 2022 Men's Softball Asia Cup.

See also
Asian Women's Softball Championship

References

International softball competitions
Softball Championship
Recurring sporting events established in 1968
Men's sports competitions in Asia